Tang-e Tir (also Romanized as Tang-e Tīr) is a village in Vardasht Rural District, in the Central District of Semirom County, Isfahan Province, Iran. At the 2006 census, its population was 16, in 5 families.

References 

Populated places in Semirom County